Down Town is a magazine published in Greece by the Imako Media Group. Aimed at fashionable Greek adults, it is one of the best-selling weekly magazines in Greece with a circulation of 27,000. It was established in December 1995. The magazine often features sexually provocative content and always features an attractive female or male Greek celebrity on the cover.

2011 cover features included Sissi Christidou, Erika Prezerakou, Maria Solomou, Kalomoira Sarantis, Zeta Makrypoulia, Alexis Georgoulis, Katerina Papoutsaki, Michalis Hatzigiannis, Eleonora Meleti, Elli Kokkinou, Sakis Rouvas and Dimitra Matsouka.

References

Magazines published in Greece
Magazines established in 1995
Celebrity magazines
Entertainment magazines
Weekly magazines
1995 establishments in Greece